Joseph Ezekiel Strick (July 6, 1923 – June 1, 2010, aged 86) was an American director, producer and screenwriter.

Life and career
Born in the Pittsburgh area town of Braddock, Pennsylvania, Strick briefly attended UCLA, then enrolled in the U.S. Army during World War II. In the Army, he served as a cameraman in the Army Air Forces.

In 1948, he and Irving Lerner produced Muscle Beach. For several years in the 1950s, Lerner, Strick, Ben Maddow, and Sidney Meyers worked part-time on the experimental documentary The Savage Eye (1959).

Strick was also a successful businessman, founding Electrosolids Corp (1956), Computron Corp. (1958), Physical Sciences Corp (1958), and Holosonics Corp. (1960). In 1977 he invented the usage of six-axis motion simulators as entertainment systems and applied it to new machines used now in Disney theme parks as "Star Tours."

In the 1960s, during his first marriage, Strick commissioned what was the only house designed by Oscar Niemeyer in North America. The marriage ended in divorce before construction was completed, and Strick never occupied the house, located on the edge of Santa Monica Canyon.

The Savage Eye won the BAFTA Flaherty Documentary Award and was hailed as part of an "American New Wave" alongside the work of Shirley Clarke and John Cassavetes. In 1970, he won an Academy Award for Best Documentary for his movie Interviews with My Lai Veterans. His better known ventures include a film adaptation of James Joyce's Ulysses and A Portrait of the Artist as a Young Man as well as Never Cry Wolf (1983). He also directed Tropic of Cancer, based on the novel by Henry Miller.

In Britain, he directed at the Royal Shakespeare Company (1964) and the National Theatre (2003).

Joseph Strick's career led him to share his time in Los Angeles, New York, London and Paris. He died in a Paris hospital of congestive heart failure.

The moving image collection of Joseph Strick is held at the Academy Film Archive. The collection consists of over one hundred items, including negative and print materials.  The Academy Film Archive has preserved several of Strick's films, including The Savage Eye and Muscle Beach.

References

Margot Norris, Ulysses (University of Cork Press, 2004)
Bosley Crowther, The Great Films  (G. P. Putnam's Sons, 1967), pages 247-250
William Wulf, Landmark Films (Paddington Press, 1979) pages 278-290
Michael Webb, A Modernist Paradise (Rizzoli, 2004)

External links

 'Portrait of Joe as a Young Director'-documentary of Joe talking about 'Ulysses' and 'Portrait of the Artist as a Young Man'
 The Hecklers 1966, BBC Documentary on British elections and 'heckling' with introduction by Strick.

1923 births
2010 deaths
American documentary filmmakers
American male screenwriters
People from Braddock, Pennsylvania
United States Air Force airmen
Film directors from Pennsylvania
Screenwriters from Pennsylvania
United States Army Air Forces personnel of World War II
Deaths from congestive heart failure